{{Infobox settlement
| name                            = Mentiri National Housing Area 'B'
| official_name                   = Kampong Mentiri National Housing Scheme Area 'B'
| native_name                     = ''Perumahan Negara Mentiri Kawasan 'B| native_name_lang                = ms
| settlement_type                 = Village
| pushpin_map                     = Brunei
| pushpin_label_position          = none
| pushpin_map_caption             = Location in Brunei
| coordinates                     = 
| subdivision_type                = Country
| subdivision_name                = Brunei
| subdivision_type1               = District
| subdivision_type2               = Subdistrict
| subdivision_name1               = Brunei-Muara
| subdivision_name2               = Mentiri
| government_footnotes            = 
| leader_title                    = Village head
| leader_name                     = Pengiran Ibrahim Pengiran Hidup
| postal_code_type                = Postcode
| postal_code                     = BU2229
}}Mentiri National Housing Area 'B' or Mentiri National Housing Area 2''' is a village administrative division of Brunei-Muara District, Brunei. It is a village subdivision under the mukim or subdistrict of Mentiri. Mentiri National Housing Area 'B' is also a designated postcode area with the postcode BU2229.

Geography 
Mentiri National Housing Area 'B' is located in the north-eastern part of Brunei-Muara District. It borders the village subdivisions of Batu Marang to the north, Mentiri National Housing Area 'A' to the east, Pangkalan Sibabau to the south and Mentiri to the west.

See also 
 Mentiri National Housing Area 'A'
 National Housing Scheme

References 

Villages of Brunei